is a Japanese professional footballer who will play as a defensive midfielder for Primeira Liga club Santa Clara

Club career
Converted to a central midfielder during his time in Tokyo Verdy's youth ranks, after a short trial he was fully promoted to first team of Verdy in 2015.

In January 2016, Misao signed for Kashima Antlers.

He was chosen as one of the candidates for award 2018 Asian Footballer of the Year.

After consistently good seasons at Kashima Antlers, he experienced a different role on his last season with the club. Since Mitsuo Ogasawara's retirement on 2018, he started several matches wearing the captain's armband, despite the relatively young age for a player to be named captain. On 2022, due to many problems regarding the back-line underperformances at the start of the season, Misao had to switch his position, playing as a center-back for the most part of the season.

After showcasing his versatility and consistency at the Antlers, Misao was considered by Santa Clara as "a polivalent midfielder, who despite having better defensive proficiency, can also play in less defensive roles in the midfield." In December 2022, the then 26-year old Misao was announced for them as a 2022–23 new mid-season signing, coming in an initial transfer period of one season and a half, with an option to extend his contract for another two seasons.

International career
In October 2013, Misao was elected for the Japan U-17 national team, as part of the 2013 U-17 World Cup squad. He featured in 2 matches in the tournament.

In May 2018, he was named in Japan's preliminary squad for the 2018 World Cup in Russia. However, Japan's manager Akira Nishino did not select Misao into the final 23-player squad.

Career statistics

Club

International

Personal life
His elder brother Yuto is also a professional footballer.

References

External links

Profile at Kashima Antlers

1996 births
Living people
Association football people from Tokyo Metropolis
Japanese footballers
Japanese expatriate footballers
Japanese expatriate sportspeople in Portugal
Expatriate footballers in Portugal
J1 League players
J2 League players
Primeira Liga players
Tokyo Verdy players
Kashima Antlers players
C.D. Santa Clara players
Association football midfielders
Japan international footballers
People from Musashino, Tokyo